VV Geldrop is a football club from Geldrop, Netherlands. VV Geldrop plays in the 2017–18 Sunday Eerste Klasse D.

From the late 1970s up to the early 2000s the club played continuously in the Hoofdklasse, at that time the highest amateur league. In 1984, 1987 and 1990 they even became overall amateur champions.

References

External links
 Official site

Football clubs in the Netherlands
Football clubs in North Brabant
Sport in Geldrop-Mierlo
Association football clubs established in 1926
1926 establishments in the Netherlands